Kissamos is a town and a municipality in the west of the island of Crete, Greece. It is part of the Chania regional unit and of the former Kissamos Province which covers the northwest corner of the island. The town of Kissamos is also known as Kastelli Kissamou and often known simply as Kastelli after the Venetian castle that was there. It is now a port and fishing harbour, with a regular ferry from the Peloponnese via Kythira. A town museum is located in the old Venetian governor's palace and there have been important archaeological finds in the town, including fine mosaics, dating from the Roman city of Kisamos (Latinized as Cisamus). The head town of the municipality is Kastelli-Kissamos itself.

History 

Strabo said that ancient Cisamus was dependent on Aptera and was its naval arsenal. The Peutinger Table distinguishes two port towns in Crete called Cisamus, Modern Kissamos (at 35°29′38″N 23°39′25″E) is much further west than where Aptera is now placed (at 35°27′46″N 24°8′31″E). It was excluded already by Pashley in 1837 as being, of the two ancient maritime Cretan cities named Kisamos, the one associated with Aptera. In the past, when the port of Aptera was thought to be present-day Kissamos, some supposed Aptera to be identical with Polyrrhenia, and Kissamos to be the port of Polyrrhenia. However, Strabo and other ancient sources say that Polyrrhenia's port was at Phalasarna on the west coast.

Ecclesiastical history 

Ancient Cisamus became a Christian bishopric, a suffragan of the metropolitan see of Gortyna, the capital of the Roman province of Crete.
Only two of its first-millennium bishops are named in extant contemporary documents: Theopemptus (according to 18th-century Lequien), Nicetas (according to 20th-century Janin) at the Trullan Council in 692, and Leo at the Second Council of Nicaea in 787.

Orthodox bishopric 
The bishopric is still a residential see of the Eastern Orthodox Church of Crete.

Latin diocese 
After the Venetian conquest of Crete in 1212, Kissamos became a Latin Church diocese. The names of more than 20 residential Latin bishops from then until the end of the 16th century are known, including :

 Angelo Barbarigo (1383 – 1406.09.21)
 Prospero Santacroce (1548.03.22 – 1572?)

Municipality 

The municipality of Kissamos was formed at the 2011 local government reform by the merger of three former municipalities, which became municipal units:
 Kissamos
 Innachori
 Mythimna

The municipal unit of Kissamos includes the Gramvousa peninsula (Chernisos Gramvousas Χερσόνησος Γραμβούσας) in the northwest and the adjacent Gramvousa islets, as well as the islet of Pontikonisi, and the villages of Sfinari, Koukounaras, Polirinia, Platanos, Lousakia, Sirikari, Kallergiania and Kalathena. It forms the extreme western part of the Chania regional unit, and of Crete. It is bordered by Platanias to the East, and by Kantanos-Selino to the south.

Former province 
The province of Kissamos was one of the provinces of the Chania Prefecture. Its territory corresponded with that of the current municipality of Kissamos, and the municipal units of Kolymvari and Voukolies (partly). It was abolished in 2006.

Notable locals 
 Manos Katrakis (1908–1984), actor
 Giorgis Koutsourelis (1914–1994), Cretan music composer

See also 
 List of communities of Chania

References

Sources and external links

See Chania Region for maps
 Municipality description
 Kissamos TV Official Website
 GTP description
 The district of Kissamos
 GCatholic with Latin residential and titular incumbent biography links

Municipalities of Crete
Populated places in Chania (regional unit)
Former Roman Catholic dioceses in Europe
Castles in Greece
Greek War of Independence
Provinces of Greece